Körslaget 2010 is the fourth season of TV4's entertainment show Körslaget. It premiered on 20 March 2010.  A feature of this season was Gabriel Forss's comment on each performance, and a choir was led by two contestants, Team Rongedal. It was also the first season to be aired on TV4 HD.

Contestants
Niklas Strömstedt with a choir from Växjö
Marie Picasso with a choir from Västerås
Morgan "Mojje" Johansson with a choir from Visby
Kalle Moraeus with a choir from Orsa
Linda Sundblad with a choir from Lidköping
Ralf Gyllenhammar with a choir from från Mölnlycke
Rongedal with a choir from Karlstad

Episode 1
Aired 20 March

Team Rongedal - This Love (Maroon 5)
Team Mojje - I Gotta Feeling (The Black Eyed Peas)
Team Picasso - We Built This City (Starship)
Team Strömstedt  - God Only Knows (Beach Boys)
Team Sundblad - Wannabe (Spice Girls)
Team Gyllenhammar - Fox on the Run (Sweet)
Team Moraeus - Jag såg i öster (Folkmusik)

Results

No choir was eliminated

Program 2
Aired 27 March

Team Picasso - Proud Mary (Tina Turner)
Team Strömstedt  - Turn, turn, turn (The Byrds)
Team Gyllenhammar - I love it loud (Kiss)
Team Sundblad - Girls just wanna have fun (Cyndi Lauper)
Team Mojje - Fireflies (Owl City)
Team Moraeus - Klinga mina klockor (Benny Andersson)
Team Rongedal - Somebody to love (Queen)

Elimination
The Choir with the darkest shade of gray was eliminated.

Episode 3
Aired 3 April

Team Strömstedt - Om (Niklas Strömstedt)
Team Sundblad - Let's Dance (Linda Sundblad)
Team Rongedal - Just a minute (Rongedal)
Team Moreus - Underbart (Kalle Moraeus)
Team Picasso - This moment (Marie Picasso)
Team Mojje - Var ligger landet där man böjer bananerna (Morgan (Mojje) Johansson)

Elimination
The Choir with the darkest shade of gray was eliminated.

Elimination chart

References

TV4 (Sweden) original programming
2010 Swedish television seasons